Good Soldier Songs is a London-based, Independent Music Publishing Company, owned by Christian Tattersfield. Established in 2003, Good Soldier Songs represent writers such as Biffy Clyro, The 1975, Freya Ridings, Ollie Green, John Gibbons, The Wombats, Birdy, Gavin James and David Gray. Good Soldier Songs was awarded Publisher of the Year by Music Business Worldwide in 2016 as well as 2018.

In 2014 the company opened an independent recording arm, Good Soldier Records, with signings to date including Gavin James, John Gibbons, Freya Ridings, and Larkins.

In May 2020, Good Soldier was acquired by Downtown Music Publishing.

References

Music production companies